Latham United Methodist Church is a historic church building on the east side of Highway 59 in Latham, Alabama.  It was built in 1906 and added to the National Register of Historic Places in 1988.

References

Methodist churches in Alabama
Churches on the National Register of Historic Places in Alabama
National Register of Historic Places in Baldwin County, Alabama
Gothic Revival church buildings in Alabama
Churches completed in 1906
Churches in Baldwin County, Alabama
1906 establishments in Alabama